Dello di Niccolò Delli ( 1403 – c. 1470), also known as Dello Delli, Dello di Niccolò and Dello, was an Italian sculptor and painter from Florence. His father was a tailor named Niccolò di Dello. Painters Nicola Delli and Sansone Delli were his less famous younger brothers.

In 1424, Niccolò Delli was sentenced to death for abandoning his post and fled to Siena with his family. In 1427, the family fled again―this time to Venice. From 1430 to 1433, Dello is known to have been in Florence. From 1433 to 1445 he lived in Spain, working in the Court of King John II of Castile, where he was knighted. His works include the apse cycle in the Old Cathedral of Salamanca. In 1446 he probably worked at Naples in Castel Nuovo.

References 
 Condorelli, Adele, Precisazioni su Dello Delli e su Nicola Fiorentino, Commentari 19/3 (1968), 197–211.
 Dizionario enciclopedico Bolaffi dei pittori e degli incisori italiani dall'XI al XX secolo, Turin, Giulio Bolaffi, 1972–1976.
 Thieme, Ulrich and Felix Becker, Allgemeines Lexikon der bildenden Künstler von der Antike bis zur Gegenwart, Reprint of 1907 edition, Leipzig, Veb E.A. Seemann Verlag, 1980–1986.
 Vasari, Giorgio, Le Vite delle più eccellenti pittori, scultori, ed architettori, many editions and translations.

1400s births
1470s deaths
Artists from Florence
Quattrocento painters
Italian male painters
15th-century Italian sculptors
Italian male sculptors
15th-century Italian painters
Catholic sculptors